Johan Henrik Christian Schildt (born 7 May 1959 in Stockholm) is a Swedish actor, screenwriter, publisher.

Johan Schildt also runs the publishing company Inova that published notably the astronomical yearbook titled Astronomisk Årsbok and later also the astronomical calendar Stjärnhimlen - utgivningen. Both yearbooks ceased paper publication in 2000. But the calendar is still available online.

He is the son of actor Henrik Schildt and his second wife, the actress Berit Schildt, née Gramer. He is also half brother to the artist and translator Veronica Schildt and to actor Peter Schildt.

Selected filmography
1979 – Trälarnas uppror (TV series)
1981 – Det våras för Smurfan
1981 – Smurferna och den fiffige trollkarlen
1986 – Amorosa
1987 – Varuhuset (TV series)
1994 – Niente più
1995 – Anmäld försvunnen (TV series)
1998 – Muntra fruarna i Windsor
1998 – OP7 (TV series)
2001 – Nya tider (TV series)
2010 – Klara
2011 – Bibliotekstjuven (TV series)
2012 – Tingeling – Vingarnas hemlighet

References

External links
Official website

Male actors from Stockholm
1959 births
Living people
Swedish male film actors
Swedish screenwriters
Swedish male screenwriters
Swedish publishers (people)
Swedish male television actors
20th-century Swedish male actors